Sylviane Ainardi is a French politician, who, from 1989 until 2004, was a Member of the European Parliament (MEP) representing France. She is a member of the French Communist Party.

References

1947 births
Living people
People from Savoie
French Communist Party MEPs
MEPs for France 1989–1994
MEPs for France 1994–1999
MEPs for France 1999–2004
20th-century women MEPs for France
21st-century women MEPs for France